SQL:2016 or ISO/IEC 9075:2016 (under the general title "Information technology – Database languages – SQL") is the eighth revision of the ISO (1987) and ANSI (1986) standard for the SQL database query language. It was formally adopted in December 2016. The standard consists of 9 parts which are described in some detail in SQL.

New features

SQL:2016 introduced 44 new optional features. 22 of them belong to the JSON functionality, ten more are related to polymorphic table functions. The additions to the standard include:

 JSON: Functions to create JSON documents, to access parts of JSON documents and to check whether a string contains valid JSON data
 Row Pattern Recognition: Matching a sequence of rows against a regular expression pattern
 Date and time formatting and parsing
 LISTAGG: A function to transform values from a group of rows into a delimited string
 Polymorphic table functions: table functions without predefined return type
 New data type DECFLOAT

See also

 Wikibook SQL
 Slowly changing dimension

References

External links
 .
 ISO/IEC TR 19075-5:2016: Row Pattern Recognition in SQL
 ISO/IEC TR 19075-6:2017: SQL support for JavaScript Object Notation (JSON)
 ISO/IEC TR 19075-7:2017: Polymorphic table functions in SQL

 
Declarative programming languages
Query languages
Computer-related introductions in 2016